Ideal Woman Sought (German: Ideale Frau gesucht) is a 1952 Austrian musical film directed by Franz Antel and starring Inge Egger, Jeanette Schultze and Waltraut Haas.

It was made at the Schönbrunn Studios in Vienna.

Cast
 Inge Egger as Irene Mertens  
 Jeanette Schultze as Ruth  
 Waltraut Haas as Luise  
 Susi Nicoletti as Chérie  
 Wolf Albach-Retty as Robby Holm  
 Gunther Philipp as Stefan Blitz  
 Oskar Sima as Bierhaus  
 Rudolf Carl as Krappl  
 Cornelia Froboess as Cornelia, Sängerin  
 Fritz von Friedl as Peter  
 Ilse Peternell as Isolde  
 Jutta Bornemann as Frl. Wurm  
 Hilde Jaeger as Frl. Aufrecht 
 Peter Preses as Dir. Maier  
 Raoul Retzer as Gigantino  
 Hellmuth Schönemaker 
 Otto Stuppacher
 Theodor Grieg 
 Rita Paul as Singer

References

Bibliography 
 Robert Dassanowsky. Austrian Cinema: A History. McFarland, 2005.

External links 
 

1952 films
1952 musical films
Austrian musical films
1950s German-language films
Films directed by Franz Antel
Schönbrunn Studios films
Constantin Film films
Austrian black-and-white films